Aeroflot Flight 6263 was a scheduled domestic passenger flight from Krasnodar International Airport to Perm International Airport, with stopovers in Volgograd, Saratov, and Kazan. Of the 39 passengers and crew on board the aircraft, four survived the initial crash; however, all survivors had died by the time rescuers arrived at the scene.

Aircraft
The aircraft involved in the accident was an Antonov An-24B with registration CCCP-46276. The aircraft first flew in 1967.

Accident
Four of the 39 passengers and crew on board initially survived the crash; however, all of the initial survivors had died of exposure to the cold by the time rescuers arrived at the scene.

Investigators were unable to conclusively determine the cause of the crash. Some signs of a missile explosion were found, such as dots of green paint that were not from the aircraft. However, the Ministry of Defence denied that there had been any exercises in the area at the time of the crash.

References

Aviation accidents and incidents in 1973
Aviation accidents and incidents in the Soviet Union
6263
Accidents and incidents involving the Antonov An-24